The Restitution of Illicit Assets Act, also known as the Federal Act on the Restitution of Assets of Politically Exposed Persons obtained by Unlawful Means, is a Swiss law which allows for the seizures of the assets of persons who have been accused of obtaining such assets in other countries (including state coffers) through unlawful means. It came into force on 1 February 2011.

References

External links 
 Dictators' assets (potentate funds)

Law of Switzerland
Privacy legislation
Banking in Switzerland
Political corruption
Law